"Three Wonderful Letters from Home" is a World War I song written by Ballard MacDonald & Joe Goodwin and composed by James F. Hanley. The song was first published in 1918 by Shapiro, Bernstein & Co., in New York City. The sheet music cover, illustrated by Albert Wilfred Barbelle, depicts a mother, wife, and daughter writing letters with marching troops and a plane, ship, and tank in the background.

This song was in the top 20 charts from May to July 1918 and reached No. 13 in June. It was recorded by both Charles Hart and Henry Burr. Also on the disc was the song "Daddy Mine" by Lew Wilson and Alfred Dubin.

The sheet music can be found at the Pritzker Military Museum & Library.

References 

Bibliography

1918 songs
Songs about letters (message)
Songs of World War I
Songs with lyrics by Ballard MacDonald
Songs written by James F. Hanley